The Gornergrat Railway (GGB) is a  mountain rack railway, located in the Swiss canton of Valais. The line opened in 1898, and was the first electric rack railway to be built in Switzerland.
The Gornergrat is a starting point for many hikes, as it lies surrounded by 29 peaks rising above  in the Alps and several glaciers, including the Gorner Glacier (which is billed as the second longest glacier in the Alps). At the end of the line on Gornergrat, the Matterhorn is visible on a clear day.  It is also a popular skiing area.

The Gornergrat Railway Ltd (Gornergrat Bahn AG) is a wholly owned subsidiary of BVZ Holdings AG, who are also the majority owners of the  Matterhorn Gotthard Verkehrs AG, the company that operates the Matterhorn Gotthard Bahn (MGB), with which the GGB connects in Zermatt.

History
Work on the railway started in 1896, five years after the Visp-Zermatt-Bahn had linked Zermatt to Visp and the Rhone Valley. The line opened on August 20, 1898, and was electrified from the start. Initially it only operated in summer, but year-round operation was extended to the lower section of the line in 1929, and to the summit in 1941. The Gornegrat Railway was the highest railway in Europe until the opening of the Jungfrau Railway in 1912.

The upper terminal was remodelled in 2004.

Operation

Route
There are several passenger stops on the line:

There are also freight-only stations at Ladegleis Findelbach, which is on a short branch from the passenger station at Findelbach, and at Riffelboden, which is situated between Riffelalp and Riffelberg passenger stations.

Infrastructure
It is built to metre gauge and uses the Abt rack system throughout. It is one of four lines in the world using three-phase electric power,  requiring two overhead conductors, with the track forming the third conductor. There is a non-powered connection with the metre gauge Matterhorn Gotthard Bahn at Zermatt to allow transfer of freight and delivery of rolling stock.

Rolling stock 
The line uses the following rolling stock:

The railway typically operates two-railcar trains, and can carry approximately 2,500 people per hour from Zermatt to the mountain summit.

Gallery

See also
 List of mountain railways in Switzerland

References

External links

 Gornergrat Bahn website (English version)

Railway lines in Switzerland
Metre gauge railways in Switzerland
Mountain railways
Railway companies of Switzerland
Railway lines opened in 1898
Railways using three-phase power
Rack railways in Switzerland
Electric railways in Switzerland
Transport in Zermatt
1898 establishments in Switzerland